= K. V. Subba Reddy =

Indian politician

K. V. Subba Reddy is an Indian politician who was an Indian National Congress Member of the Legislative Assembly of Andhra Pradesh from Nellore constituency from 1978 to 1983 and 1985 to 1989.
